Molten is a word to describe an object that has melted.

Molten may also refer to:
 Molten Corporation a Japanese sports equipment and automotive parts company
 Mölten, a municipality in South Tyrol, Italy

See also 
 Molton (disambiguation)
 Moulton (disambiguation)